The Petersburg Military District (Питербургский вое́нный о́круг) was a Military District of the Russian Empire originally created in August 1864 following Order B-228 of Dmitry Milyutin, the Minister of War of the Russian Empire. The order, signed on 10 (22) August established that "for local control of the Ground Armed Forces and military establishments, are formed ... Military-regional administrations in the following ten military districts" of which one was Petersburg. The District's forces gained combat experience in the Russo-Turkish (1877–1878) and Russo-Japanese (1904–05) wars. Finland Military District was merged into the Petersburg District in 1905.

By a decision of Emperor Nicholas II on 24 August 1914, the names of units and establishments within the District were changed to Petrograd Military District. This District was established as a part of the RKKA by order в"– 71 of the Highest Military Council of 6 September 1918. On 1 February 1924, by the order в"– 126 the Revolutionary Military Councils of the USSR the Petrograd military district was renamed the Leningrad Military District.

Commander of the Saint Petersburg Military District 
08.1864 - 04.1880 - Adjutant General, Engineer General, Grand Duke Nikolai Nikolaevich;
04.1880 - 03.1881 - General of Infantry, Tsarevich Grand Duke Alexander Alexandrovich (from 01/03/1881 Emperor Alexander III);
03.1881 - 10.1905 - Adjutant General, General of Infantry, Grand Duke Vladimir Alexandrovich;
10.1905 - 07.1914 - adjutant general, general of the cavalry, Grand Duke Nikolai Nikolaevich;
08.1914 - 11.1914 - General of Infantry Baron Nikolai Pavlovich von Asheberg (acting commander of the Petrograd Military District);
09.1915 - 06.1916 - engineer-general Prince Nikolai Evseevich Tumanov;
06.1916 - 02.1917 - Lieutenant General Sergey Semyonovich Khabalov;
02.1917 - 03.1917 - Adjutant General, General of Artillery Nikolai Iudovich Ivanov;
03.1917 - 04.1917 - Lieutenant General Lavr Kornilov;
04.1917 - 05.1917 - General of Infantry Evgeny Aleksandrovich Radkevich (temporarily);
05.1917 - 07.1917 - Major General Peter Polovtsov;
07.1917 - 08.1917 - Major General Oleg Petrovich Vasilkovsky;  
08.1917 - 09.1917 - Lieutenant General Vladimir Vladimirovich Teplov; 
09.1917 - 10.1917 - Colonel Georgy Polkovnikov;
10.1917 - 10.1917 : Major General Yakov Gerasimovich Bagratuni;.

Disbandment 
After the October Revolution by order of the Bolshevik head of the Military District Konstantin Eremeev, the old district was disbanded, and on March 20, 1918 on its basis, the Petrograd VO of the Red Army was created, headed by a collegium.

References 

Military districts of the Russian Empire